Ligon may refer to:


People
 Austin Ligon (born c. 1951), American businessman and investor
 Betty J. Ligon (1921–2015), American journalist
 Bill Ligon (born 1952), American basketball player
 David G. Ligon (1804–1855), American jurist and justice of the Supreme Court of Alabama
 Glenn Ligon (born 1960), American conceptual artist
 Jennie Ligon (1916–2012), also known as Jeni Le Gon, African-American dancer, dance instructor and actress
 Jim Ligon (1944–2004), American basketball player
 Joe Ligon (born 1937 or 1938), American convicted murderer
 Joe Ligon (singer) (1936–2016), American gospel singer
 Nina Ligon (born 1991), Thai equestrian
 Randy Ligon, American politician elected in 2018
 Richard Ligon (1585?–1662), English writer
 Robert F. Ligon (1823–1901), American politician
 Rufus Ligon (1903–1992), American Negro league pitcher
 Thomas Lygon or Ligon (1623–1675), colonial Virginian statesman, militia officer and landowner
 Thomas Watkins Ligon (1810–1881), American politician
 Verda Ligon (1902–1970), American painter and printmaker
 William Ligon (born 1961), American former politician
 Ligon Duncan (born 1960), American Presbyterian scholar and pastor
 Ligon Flynn (1931–2010), American architect
 Ligon or Lation Scott (1893–1917), African-American lynching victim

Places
 Ligon, Georgia, United States, a ghost town
 Ligon, Kentucky, United States, an unincorporated community

Schools
 Ligon Middle School (North Carolina)

See also
 Lygon, the surname of a British aristocratic family